Dakenba is a rural locality in the Shire of Banana, Queensland, Australia.

Geography 
The Moura railway line passes from the north-west (Callide) to the east (Mount Murchison). The locality is served by Dakenba railway station.

Callide Creek flows from the north-west (Callide) to the south-east (Valentine Plains).

History 
Callide Bridge State School opened 10 June 1929, but had a number of name changes in 1929 including Melton and Raeworth before becoming Raedon State School. It closed in 1959. It was at 11 Teys Road, now within Biloela but on the locality boundary with Dakenba.

Education 
There are no schools in Dakenba. The nearest government primary schools are Mount Murchison State School in neighbouring Mount Murchison to the east and Biloela State School in neighbouring Biloela to the south. The nearest government secondary school is Biloela State High School in neighbouring Biloea to the south.

References 

Shire of Banana
Localities in Queensland